Bari is the Nilotic language of the Karo people, spoken over large areas of Central Equatoria state in South Sudan, across the northwest corner of Uganda, and into the Democratic Republic of Congo.

Bari is spoken by several distinct tribes: the Bari people themselves, the Pojulu, Kakwa, Nyangwara, Mundari, and Kuku. Each has its own dialect. The language is therefore sometimes called Karo or Kutuk ('mother tongue') rather than Bari.

Bari is a tone language. It has vowel harmony, subject–verb–object word order, and agglutinative verbal morphology with some suppletion.  A very competent dictionary and grammar were published in the 1930s, but are very difficult to find today.  More recently, a dissertation has been published on Bari tonal phonology, and another dissertation on Bari syntax is available.

Dialects
Dialects are:
 Bari proper (Beri)
 Pöjulu (Pajulu, Fadjulu, Fajelu, Madi)
 Kakwa (Kakua, Kwakwak) [radio broadcasts in Uganda]
 Nyangbara (Nyangwara, Nyambara)
 Mandari (Mondari, Mundari, Chir, Kir, Shir)
 Kuku
 Nyepu (Nyefu, Nyepo, Nypho, Ngyepu)
 Ligo (Liggo)

Phonology 
Bari has a cross-height vowel-harmony system.

Orthography
The Bari alphabet is used by the Bari and Kuku in South Sudan. There are four digraphs, 'B, 'D, 'Y and Ny, and the letter eng, Ŋ.

References

General References
 Bari Language, Sudan Primer: Sillabari Ko Kutuk Na Bari. The Catholic Press Institute. Juba, Sudan.
 Owen, R.C.R. Bari grammar and vocabulary. 1908. OCLC: 25040516
 Spagnolo, Lorenzo M. Bari grammar. 1933. Verona, Missioni Africane..  OCLC: 34898784
 Yokwe, Eluzai. The tonal grammar of Bari.  Doctoral dissertation, University of Illinois at Urbana-Champaign.  1987.

External links 
 Kitap Kwakwaset The Book of Common Prayer in Bari (1953)
 https://web.archive.org/web/20090215100524/http://www.openroad.net.au/languages/african/

Agglutinative languages
Eastern Nilotic languages
Latin alphabets
Languages of South Sudan
Languages of Uganda
Vowel-harmony languages